Nido Qubein is a Lebanese American businessman and motivational speaker. He has been the president of High Point University since 2005. He received his associate degree in business from Mount Olive College, his bachelor degree in human relations from High Point University in 1970, and a Master of Science in business education from the University of North Carolina at Greensboro Bryan School of Business & Economics in 1973. Qubein is the founder and chairman emeritus of the National Speakers Association Foundation. He has served as chairman of the Great Harvest Bread Company since 2001 and sits on the board of directors of BB&T (now Truist Financial),  La-Z-Boy Corporation, and nThrive.

From 2005, when Qubein became the seventh president of High Point University, to 2020, the school nearly tripled both the number of faculty and its traditional undergraduate enrollment, adding four academic schools. Qubein is notable for being among the higher-paid college presidents in the United States, earning $2.9 million a year in 2013. In 2016, The Chronicle of Higher Education reported that Qubein was the third-highest donor university president in the country, from 2006 to 2016. He committed $10 million to High Point University.

Honors
In 2000, Qubein was inducted into the Horatio Alger Association of Distinguished Americans. In 1999, Qubein was honored with the Distinguished Alumni Award from the University of North Carolina at Greensboro Bryan School of Business & Economics. In 2000, Toastmasters International awarded him their Golden Gavel Medal. He was awarded the National Ethnic Coalition of Organizations' Ellis Island Medal of Honor. In 2012, he was awarded the Daughters of the American Revolution Americanism Medal.

In early 2017, High Point University announced that it would name its new basketball arena and conference center for Qubein and his wife, Mariana. Construction on the new facility started in 2018 and opened in September 2021.

Broadcasts
Beginning in January 2012, UNCTV began airing High Point University Presents A Conversation with... series. The hour-long segments feature Qubein interviewing prominent leaders and innovators.

In 2015, the Biography Channel aired Nido Qubein: A Life of Success and Significance.

A new interview series premiered in 2021 called “Side by Side with Nido Qubein”.  The hour long discussion show airs on PBS NC.

Publications
Qubein has written 11 books, including How To Communicate Like A Pro and Stairway to Success: The Complete Blueprint for Personal and Professional Achievement.

The September 2012 issue of Success magazine featured Qubein discussing his role as president of High Point University. The story chronicles Qubein's leadership of the school since taking the helm in 2005.

Personal
Qubein was born the youngest of five children in 1948 and is of Lebanese and Jordanian descent. He came to the United States in 1966.

References

External links
 
 
 High Point University official website

1948 births
High Point University alumni
University of North Carolina at Greensboro alumni
Lebanese emigrants to the United States
Living people
American motivational speakers